Kajaran Mine, also spelled Qajaran Mine, is an active copper and molybdenum open-pit mine in Armenia's southern province of Syunik in the town of Kajaran.  It is the largest operating mine in Armenia.

It is owned and operated by Zangezur Copper and Molybdenum Combine.

Gallery

See also

Mineral industry of Armenia

Copper mines in Armenia
Molybdenum mines in Armenia
Surface mines in Armenia
Mines in the Soviet Union